Helmut Piirimäe (September 8, 1930 – 21 August 2017) was a prominent Estonian historian. He was professor emeritus of University of Tartu, and an honorary doctor of University of Uppsala.

Piirimäe researched Estonian history under the Swedish Empire in the 17th century, but also the Enlightenment in the 18th century, especially the French Revolution.

Helmut Piirimäe was married to art historian Krista Piirimäe. They have three sons and a daughter.

References

External links
Helmut Piirimäe's publications (in Estonian)

20th-century Estonian historians
1930 births
2017 deaths
Historians of Estonia
Historians of the French Revolution
University of Tartu alumni
Academic staff of the University of Tartu
21st-century Estonian historians
Recipients of the Order of the White Star, 3rd Class
People from Põltsamaa Parish